Miguel Robles may refer to:
 Miguel Robles (Arrowverse), Batwoman character
 Miguel Robles (fencer) (born 1974), Bolivian fencer
 Miguel Robles (swimmer) (born 1987), Mexican swimmer
 Miguel Alessio Robles, Mexican lawyer and professor in law